Events from the year 1922 in Sweden

Incumbents
 Monarch – Gustaf V
 Prime Minister – Hjalmar Branting

Events
 4–12 February – The Nordic Games take place in Stockholm.
 27 August – 1922 Swedish prohibition referendum
 17 November – The Swedish Ice Hockey Association is founded in Stockholm by representatives from seven clubs.
 Date unknown – Dissolution of the Allmänna Barnhuset.
 Date unknown – Foundation of the Kvinnliga medborgarskolan vid Fogelstad.

Births

 17 March – Gustav Freij, wrestler (died 1973).
 6 May – Sandro Key-Åberg, writer (died 1991). 
 1 June – Baron Povel Ramel, musician and entertainer (died 2007)
 10 June – Ann-Britt Leyman, athlete (died 2013).
 1 August – Kjell Hjertsson, footballer (died 2013).
 8 October – Nils Liedholm, footballer (died 2007).

Deaths

 2 July – Gurli Åberg, stage actress (born 1843)
 Maria Andersson (businesswoman) (born 1837)

References

External links

 
Years of the 20th century in Sweden